Urmi is a village in Elva Parish, Valga County in southeastern Estonia. Urmi has a population of 60 (as of 1 January 2011).

References

Villages in Valga County